Drunella grandis is a species of spiny crawler mayfly in the family Ephemerellidae. It is found in North America.

Subspecies
These three subspecies belong to the species Drunella grandis:
 Drunella grandis flavitincta (McDunnough, 1934)
 Drunella grandis grandis (Eaton, 1884)
 Drunella grandis ingens (McDunnough, 1934)

References

Mayflies
Articles created by Qbugbot
Insects described in 1884